Tang Soo Do (Hangul: 당수도, Hanja: 唐手道 ) refers to a Korean martial art
based on Karate and may include fighting principles from taekkyeon, subak, as well as northern Chinese martial arts. Before the Nine Kwans united and formed the martial art Taekwondo, Tang Soo Do was used by select Kwans to identify their Karate-derived martial arts style.

In contemporary context, after Taekwondo was founded, many Korean martial arts entities continued to use Tang Soo Do as a means to preserve the elements of Korean martial arts that evolved from the original nine kwans' Karate roots and were lost in transition to Taekwondo. The techniques of what is commonly known as Tang Soo Do combine elements of Shōtōkan, Subak, Taekkyon, and Kung Fu.

Etymology
"Tang Soo Do" (당수도) is the Korean pronunciation of the Hanja 唐手道 (pronounced Táng shǒu dào in Chinese), and translates literally to "The Way of the Tang Hand."

The same characters can be pronounced "karate-dō" in Japanese. In the early 1930s, approximately 55 years after Japan's annexation of Okinawa, Gichin Funakoshi in coordination with others changed the first character, 唐, which referred to the Chinese Tang dynasty, to 空, signifying "empty"; both characters can be pronounced "kara" in Japanese, though 唐 is more commonly rendered as "Tou". Funakoshi ostensibly wanted to avoid confusion with Chinese Kenpō. Funakoshi claimed Okinawan Karate could "now be considered a Japanese martial art" and found the China reference "inappropriate" and "in a sense degrading". The Chinese pronunciation of 空手道 is kōng-shǒu-dào, and the Korean is (공수도).

Outside of the Far East, the term "Tang Soo Do" has primarily become synonymous with the Korean martial art promoted by grandmaster Hwang Kee.

History

Between 1944 and the Liberation of Korea in 1945, the original schools or kwans of "traditional Taekwondo" were founded in Korea by practitioners who had studied karate and had some exposure to kung-fu. At the time, there were five kwans, of which only Chung Do Kwan of Won-kuk Lee and Moo Duk Kwan of Hwang Kee identified their martial arts as Tang Soo Do. Shortly after the Korean War and in 1953, four more offshoot schools formed.  Of these second-generation kwans, Choi Hong-hi and Nam Tae-hi's Oh Do Kwan and Lee Young-woo's Jung Do Kwan splintered from Chung Do Kwan style of Tang Soo Do.

In 1950s, to restore national identity after the protracted occupation of Korea by Japanese forces, the Korean government under Syngman Rhee ordered a single organization to be created. 
 On September 16, 1961, most kwans agreed to unify under the name "Korea Tae Soo Do Association". The name was changed back to the "Korea Taekwondo Association" when General Choi became its president in August 1965. In 1964, the Korean Tae Soo Do Association was formed which, in 1965, became the Korean Tae Kwon Do Association.

Chung Do Kwan 

The Chung Do Kwan still exists in Korea and now functions as a fraternal friendship social club of Kukkiwon Taekwondo. Present "Taekwondo Chung Do Kwan" organization follows the Kukkiwon curriculum and is no longer it's induvidual Tang Soo Do style. Some of the older Chung Do Kwan based schools practice the original Pyong-Ahn forms which Lee Won-Kuk incorporated from Shotokan karate.  Schools tracing their lineage to Duk Sung Son when he founded the World Tae Kwon Do Association in the United States after leaving Korea also practice Kuk Mu forms.

Other older Chung do Kwan schools practice the Palgwae forms, a predecessor of the Taegeuk forms. After black belt, practitioners of the Kukkiwon system practice the Yudanja and Kodanja series of black belt Poomsae of the Kukkiwon (Koryo, Kumgang, Taebaek, Pyongwon, Sipjin, Jitae, Cheonkwon, Hansoo, Ilyo). Many Chung Do Kwan schools also practice the Chang Hun tul, even if they are not affiliated with the International Taekwon-Do Federation.

The Chung Do Kwan-style of Tang Soo Do was introduced to United States by Jhoon Rhee. In late 1950s and early 1960s, Rhee was teaching what he called Korean Karate (or Tang Soo Do) in Texas, in the United States. After receiving the ROK Army Field Manual (which contained martial arts training curriculum under the new name of Taekwondo) from General Choi, Rhee began using the name "Taekwondo".

Moo Duk Kwan 

Because of its political influence, the KTA, led by its second president, General Choi Hong-hi, tried to assimilate the Moo Duk Kwan. Kwanjangnim's organization was the largest martial arts system in Korea at the time. Grandmaster Hwang Kee agreed to discuss unification but, when it became clear that he would not be in charge of the new organization, he ultimately refused. The result was a weakening of the Moo Duk Kwan as the Tae Kwon Do movement grew in strength, absorbing many Moo Duk Kwan members in the process.

Due to political in-fighting and splintering, Moo Duk Kwan Tang Soo Do has had several members break off. Regardless, the Moo Duk Kwan as founded by Hwang Kee persists. Hwang Kee and a large constituent of the Moo Duk Kwan continued to develop a version of Tang Soo Do that eventually became what is now known as "Soo Bahk Do Moo Duk Kwan". This modified version of Tang Soo Do incorporates more fluid "soft" movements reminiscent of certain traditional Chinese martial arts. 

After death of Hwang Kee, the Moo Duk Kwan continues to represent Soo Bahk Do worldwide, and is headed by Hwang Kee's son, Hwang Hyun-chul. 

There are still a multitude of contemporary Taekwondo schools in the United States that teach what is known as "Moo Duk Kwan Taekwondo". This nomenclature reflects this government-ordered kwan merger.

Present
The World Tang Soo Do Association and the International Tang Soo Do Federation teach systems of Tang Soo Do that existed before the Taekwondo "merger" and before the development of modern Soo Bahk Do Moo Duk Kwan. These versions of Tang Soo Do are heavily influenced by Korean culture and also appear to be related to Okinawan Karate as initially taught in Japan by Gichin Funakoshi.

The Amateur Athletic Union Taekwondo recognizes Tang Soo Do ranks, permits Tang Soo Do hyeong in competition and hosts non-Olympic-style point-sparring to accommodate the various traditional Korean stylists.

American Tang Soo Do 

American Tang Soo Do was formed in 1966 by Chuck Norris, which is combination of Moo Duk Kwan-style Tang Soo Do, Judo and Karate (Shito-Ryu and Shotokan). Over the years it has been further developed by former black belts of his and their students.

American Tang Soo Do's original governing body was the National Tang Soo Do Congress (NTC) founded in 1973 by Chuck Norris as its president and Pat E. Johnson as its vice-president and Chief of Instruction after breaking ties with the Moo Duk Kwan. In 1979, Norris dissolved the NTC and formed his current organization the United Fighting Arts Federation (UFAF) and named Johnson as executive vice president. In 1986, Norris promoted Johnson to ninth-degree black belt. 

At that time due to a philosophical difference of opinion with Norris, Johnson would leave the UFAF and reform the NTC as the governing body for American Tang Soo Do while Norris kept UFAF as the parent organization for his new martial arts system of Chun Kuk Do, in 1990.

Despite Chuck Norris leaving the American Tang Soo Do, the entity still persists.

Other 
Evolution of the style first began in 2018 when a student of Tang sou Dao a mix of sanshou/ sanda a variation of Chinese kickboxing and Kung Fu obtained a 7th degree black belt since being awarded this went on to adapt a more ruthless style of martial art where no holds barred become a prevalent way of determining a universal victor opposed to the traditional point style of ITF taekwondo where point based tournaments determined a winner. Taekwondo changed forever as the ruthless nature of this style allowed for limitless learning of striking and grappling techniques as well as the use of western boxing and body mechanics to defeat an opponent where implemented. Unlike Chuck Norris who popularised Tang Soo Do, this style is rarely seen seen in Taekwondo but can be seen as a more complete style of Bruce Lee's Jeet Kune as its principles stay true to that of early Bushido Karate and Samurai fighting.

Ranking systems

Tang Soo Do uses the colored belt system that was instituted by Judo's founder Jigoro Kano and popularized in Karate-do by Gichin Funakoshi. However, minor deviations according to organization and/or individual school are commonplace. One differentiating characteristic of the Moo Duk Kwan style is that the black belt, or dan rank, is frequently represented by a midnight blue belt (some Chung Do Kwan schools also have adopted this custom) for students who attain dan rank. The reason for the midnight blue belt is the belief in Korean culture that black symbolizes perfection. As no one is perfect, the belt for the dan rank is a midnight blue color. It was also a belief of the founder of Moo Duk Kwan, Hwang Kee, that black is a color to which nothing can be added, thus blue signifies that a dan holder is still learning. The white belt means a birth or beginning of a person's will to acquire the skills of karate, the white belt symbolizes winter. The yellow belt signifies the beaming sunlight of spring. The orange belt signifies the strength of the rising sun. (The yellow belt and the orange belt both symbolizes spring) The green belt depicts the penetration of steams and roots of the plant to get the sunlight, the green belt symbolizes summer. The red belt this stage represents the seed which is now a flowering plant, representing the students improvement, participation and advancement, It symbolizes Summer.

Many schools and organizations still opt to use the black belt. The Moo Duk Kwan, and some Chung Do Kwan schools of Tang Soo Do incorporate a red-striped midnight blue (or black) belt to denote individuals who have reached the rank of Sa Beom (master 사범님/師範님), or 4th dan. The original non-dan, or geup, belt colors established by Hwang Kee were white belt, green belt, and red belt. In the 1970s, an orange belt was added after the white belt, along with either one or two stripes on the orange, green and red belts, encompassing ten geup (student) levels, and is currently the system in use in the Moo Duk Kwan. Many variations of this ranking system are still used and typically employ other colors (such as yellow, brown, purple, and blue). However, this is primarily a western influence.

The black belts (or midnight blue belts) are called dans and each degree has its own specific name. The dan rank ranges from 1st through 9th degree. In the Moo Duk Kwan, dan level is known by its Korean numeration, such as cho dan (1st), ee dan (2nd) and sam dan (3rd), and onward. In many organizations, the titles of kyosa (instructor 교사/敎師) and sa bom (master 사범/師範) are separately awarded after successfully demonstrating ability, knowledge, understanding and character for that level in a dan simsa (심사/審査), or test. One may not test for kyosa (certified instructor) until 2nd dan, or sabom (master instructor) until 4th dan or above. Dan levels from 4th dan onward are known as kodanja (고단자/高段者), whether sabom or not. Also in the U.S., a simple timing structure was created for the dan ranking system. If in constant study, then it was easy to measure when testing for the next rank. The next dan number was equal to the minimum number of years that must be spent training to achieve that dan. For example, a first dan would have two years before they could be a candidate for second dan, and so on.

Techniques and patterns

Hyung

Forms (hyung) vary depending upon the founder or head of the different federations of Tang Soo Do. Tang Soo Do forms are a set of moves demonstrating a defensive or aggressive action for every movement taken mainly from Japanese shotokan karate kata. They are based on an offender attacking and one demonstrating the form reacting to their attack. They are generally memorized and demonstrated at a test for ranking up or a tournament.

Traditionally, nine forms are included in the curriculum of most Tang Soo Do schools, which are required study to earn the midnight blue belt. These hyung are:

Kee Cho forms: Kee Cho Il Bu, Kee Cho E bu, Kee Cho Sam Bu.
The Kee Cho series comprises basic patterns. these were created by Gichin Funakoshi, and named taikyoku in Shotokan karate.

Pyung Ahn forms: Pyung Ahn Cho Dan, Pyung Ahn E Dan, Pyung Ahn Sam Dan, Pyung Ahn Sa Dan, Pyung Ahn Oh Dan. 
The Pyung Ahn series was adopted from Okinawan and Japanese karate, where they are called Pinan/Heian and are the creation of Yasutsune Itosu, who also was one of Funakoshi's teachers.

Bassai (also known as Pal Che). The Bassai form is also from karate, where it is called Passai/Bassai Dai/Hyung, and was created by Okinawan Bushi Sokon Matsumura.

Naihanchi Some schools of Tang Soo Do include Naihanchi forms, such as naihanchi ee dan and naihanchi sam dan. .

According to Hwang Kee, he learned these forms from studying Japanese books on Okinawan karate. Most scholars agree that the primary text Hwang Kee relied upon was Gichin Funakoshi's Rentan Goshin Toudi-Jutsu published in Japan in 1925.

However, almost all original 5 kwan instructors taught these same forms and had them in their curriculum as they were direct students of Japanese Karate masters, like Gichin Funakoshi or his contemporary peer Kanren Toyama, founder of shudokan karate; or they were friends and students of the other kwan leaders.

One-step sparring

One-step sparring (Il Su Sik Dae Ryun) techniques are best described as a choreographed pattern of defense moves against the single step of an attack. Usually performed in pairs, this begins with a bow for respect. One partner then attacks, often with a simple punch, and the other person will perform a series of premeditated techniques, often in a block-attack-takedown sequence.

Other self-defense techniques
In some styles of Tang Soo Do there are techniques for defenses against grabs. In the World Tang Soo Do Association version of this, called Ho Sin Sul, there are 30 different grab defenses taught.

Free sparring
Though variation is extensive, Tang Soo Do free-sparring is similar to competitive matches in other traditional Okinawan, Japanese and Korean striking systems and may include elements of American freestyle point karate. Tang Soo Do sparring consists of point matches that are based on the three-point rule (the first contestant to score three points wins) or a two-minute rule (a tally of points over one two-minute round, but see also AAU Taekwondo point sparring handbook). Lead and rear-leg kicks and lead and rear-arm hand techniques all score equally (one point per technique). However, to encourage the use of jumping and spinning kicks, these techniques may be scored with a higher point value than standing techniques in some competitions. Open-hand techniques other than the ridgehand and leg sweeps are typically not allowed.

As in traditional Japanese karate-do kumite, scoring techniques in Tang Soo Do competition should be decisive. That is, all kicking and hand techniques that score should be delivered with sufficient footing and power so that, if they were delivered without being controlled, they would stop the aggressive motion of the opponent. There are also similarities between American freestyle point sparring (see North American Sport Karate Association [NASKA] link below) and Tang Soo Do point sparring. Much of the footwork is the same, but the position of the body when executing blows is markedly different between the styles of competition.

Rapid-fire pump-kicking seen in American freestyle point sparring is sometimes used in Tang Soo Do competition. However, in order to score, the final kick in the pump-kick combination should be delivered from a solid base (with erect posture) and with sufficient power, or the technique is not considered decisive. Consequently, the pace of a Tang Soo Do match can be somewhat slower than would be seen at a typical NASKA-type tournament, but the techniques, theoretically, should be somewhat more recognizable as linear, powerful blows that are delivered from reliably stable stances and body positions.

Variation between Tang Soo Do competitions is extensive, but are typically standardized within the various associations. Because of the close historical relationship between Tang Soo Do and Taekwondo, many of the powerful rear leg and spinning kick techniques seen in both International Taekwon-Do Federation (ITF) and World Taekwondo Federation (WTF) Taekwondo matches are commonplace in traditional Tang Soo Do competitions. The main difference is that they are not delivered with full contact to the head in Tang Soo Do.

Tang Soo Do sparring is a contact event. Though often billed as "light" or "no-contact," the typical level of contact is moderate, being controlled to both the body and head (in dan divisions). Most Tang Soo Do practitioners feel that contact in sparring is essential to understanding proper technique and necessary for developing mental preparedness and a level of relaxation critical to focused performance in stressful situations. Unnecessarily or disrespectfully harming an opponent in Tang Soo Do sparring is not tolerated.

Health and longevity of practitioners are the major goals of Tang Soo Do practice. Consequently, serious injuries are counterproductive because they retard a level of physical training that is needed to foster emotional and intellectual growth. However, minor injuries, such as bumps, bruises and the occasional loss of wind may be invaluable experiences. Each match should begin and end with respect, compassion and a deep appreciation for the opponent. Though Tang Soo Do sparring is competitive, traditional competitions are more of an exercise, or way of developing the self, than they are a competitive and game-like forum. Introspection and personal growth are fostered through free sparring.

Terminology and Korean commands
In Tang Soo Do, as in Taekwondo, commands and terminology to students are often given in Korean. However, beginning in 1955, and again in 1973, with the formation of the WTF, Taekwondo became centrally governed and Taekwondo terminology was revised favoring Korean terminology. Tang Soo Do commands pre-date these revisions and many are based on Sino-Korean words.

In popular media
Chuck Norris is one of the most famous practitioners of the martial art.

In the Karate Kid franchise, Tang Soo Do serves the basis for the fictional Karate derivative called Cobra Kai, practiced by the villainous Cobra Kai Dojo, founded by John Kreese. In particular Johnny Lawrence, a central antagonist of the 1984 film and one of the central protagonists of the sequel series Cobra Kai is one of the most well-known fictional practitioners of the art. In both appearances, Johnny Lawrence is played by William Zabka, who was trained by Pat E. Johnson for the 1984 movie.

Notable practitioners

 Won-kuk Lee (founder Chung Do Kwan)
 Hwang Kee (founder Moo Duk Kwan)
 Hwang Hyun-chul 
 Shin Jae-chul
 Peter Young Yil Choo (one of the founders of Kajukenbo)
 Dale Drouillard
 Chuck Norris
 Johnny Gyro
 Aaron Norris
 Pat E. Johnson
 Robert Wall
 Steve McQueen
 Danny Bonaduce
 Michael Jai White
 Cynthia Rothrock
 William Zabka 
 Robert Cheezic
 Jhoon Goo Rhee
 Sun Hwan Chung
 Kim Ki Whang
 Kyung Sun Shin
 Dennis Alexio
 Bruce Buffer
 Curtis Bush
 Hwang Jang-lee
 Joe Corley
 John Ratzenberger

Major organizations
 World Tang Soo Do Association 
 World Dang Soo Do Union 
 World Tang Soo Do General Federation 
 World Moo Duk Kwan 
 International Tang Soo Do Federation 
 Worldwide Tang Soo Do Family
 Asia-Pacific Tang Soo Do Federation 
 Tang Soo Do Mi Guk Kwan Assoc. - USA 
 All Martial Arts World Alliance
 Hwa Rang World Tang Soo Do Federation 
 International Martial Arts Association 
 Intercontinental Tang Soo Do Organization
 Cheezic Tang Soo Do Federation 
 Atlantic-Pacific Tang Soo Do Federation 
 Universal Tang Soo Do Alliance 
 United States Tang Soo Do Association

Further reading
 Tang Soo Do: Student Handbook of History, Etiquette and Promotional Requirements - Volume 1  Ross, Steve (2020)
 Complete Tang Soo Do Manual: From White Belt to Black Belt  Pak, Ho Sik 
 Complete Tang Soo Do Manual: From 2nd Dan to 6th Dan - Volume 2  Pak, Ho Sik and Pistella, Jack 
 Tang Soo Do: The Ultimate Guide to the Korean Martial Art, Kang Uk Lee, ; 
 Byrne, Richard and Mitchell, Penny. This Is Tang Soo Do. Malden, MA:American Tang Soo Do Association. 2001. Library of Congress Control Number 2001116262
 Hwang, K. (1995). History of Moo Duk Kwan celebrating the 50th anniversary, 1945–1995. United States: s.n. .
 
 Hancock, J. and Plyler, J. (2004). The International Tangsoodo Alliance Official Instructor's Manual, Revised Edition. Guthrie, KY: International Tangsoodo Allian

Notes

References

External links
 World Moo Duk Kwan Federation (Hwang Kee's original school)
World Tang Soo Do Association 
International Tang Soo Do Federation (Founded by Chun Sik Kim) 

Korean martial arts